The 2009 Soweto Open was a professional tennis tournament played on hard courts. It was part of the 2009 ATP Challenger Tour. It took place in Johannesburg, South Africa between 13 and 18 April 2009.

Singles entrants

Seeds

Rankings are as of 6 April 2009.

Other entrants
The following players received wildcards into the singles main draw:
  Andrew Anderson
  Raven Klaasen
  Fritz Wolmarans

The following players entry from the qualifying draw:
  Chris Eaton
  Jun Woong-Sun
  Denys Molchanov
  Noam Okun

The following players entry from Lucky loser draw:
  Benjamin Janse van Rensburg

Champions

Men's singles

 Fabrice Santoro def.  Rik de Voest, 7–5, 6–4

Men's doubles

 Chris Guccione /  George Bastl def.  Mikhail Elgin /  Alexander Kudryavtsev, 6–2, 4–6, [11–9]

References
2009 Draws
Official website
South Africa Tennis Association official website
ITF search 

Soweto Open
Tennis tournaments in South Africa
Soweto Open
Sow
Soweto Open